Jeremy M. Horst (born October 1, 1985) is an American former professional baseball pitcher. He attended Iowa Western Community College and Armstrong Atlantic State University. The Cincinnati Reds drafted him in the 21st round of the 2007 Major League Baseball Draft. He played in Major League Baseball (MLB) for the Reds and the Philadelphia Phillies.

High school

Horst played high school baseball at Des Lacs-Burlington High School in Des Lacs, North Dakota where they took second in state his senior year, behind his pitching. That same year he was named Mr. Baseball in North Dakota. He also played Legion baseball for the Burlington Bulldogs.

Playing career

Cincinnati Reds
Horst started his professional career in 2007. He played one game for the Gulf Coast League Reds and 16 for rookie-class Billings in '07, going a combined 3–2 with a 3.24 ERA in 17 relief appearances.

He played 2008 for the single-A Dayton Dragons, starting 10 games and appearing in 36 total. He went 8–2 with a 2.38 ERA. He started all of his games in 2009. In 23 starts for the single-A advanced Sarasota Reds, he went 6–13 with a 3.25 ERA; in 5 starts for double-A Carolina, he went 1–4 with a 6.21 ERA.

Horst started 2010 with the single-A advanced Lynchburg Hillcats. In 11 relief appearances, he was 0–2 with a 4.30 ERA. He was promoted to Carolina, and in 27 relief appearances, he was 3–2 with a 2.09 ERA. Horst was then promoted to triple-A Louisville and went 1–0 with a 2.51 ERA in 6 appearances (2 starts).

He received a non-roster invitation to spring training for 2011. On May 28, the Reds purchased his contract from the minors.

Horst made his debut on May 28, 2011 in relief of Bronson Arroyo against the Atlanta Braves. Horst pitched the 4th and 5th and two outs of the 6th before being relieved by José Arredondo. His first major league strike out was of Jordan Schafer, his first batter faced. In total, Horst pitched 2.2 innings, giving up 2 hits and one run, walking 0 and striking out 4. He also got his first major league hit, an RBI single from Cristhian Martínez. The Reds ended up losing in the 12th inning by a score of 7 to 6. He was optioned on June 24 when the Reds activated Aroldis Chapman from the DL. Horst was recalled on July 15 when the Reds placed José Arredondo on the DL.

Philadelphia Phillies
Horst was traded to the Philadelphia Phillies on January 25, 2012 for infielder Wilson Valdez. On June 28, Horst and Brian Sanches were called up after Chad Qualls was Designated for Assignment and Joe Savery was optioned to Triple-A Lehigh Valley. In his debut with the Phillies, he pitched a scoreless ninth against the Pirates.

In 2013, Horst had several setbacks, culminating in an elbow injury which ended his 2013 season.

After Cesar Jimenez passed Horst on the organizational depth chart, the Phillies designated Horst for assignment on June 1, 2014. He elected free agency in October 2014.

Los Angeles Dodgers
In January 2015, Horst signed a minor league contract with the Los Angeles Dodgers and was assigned to the AA Tulsa Drillers to start the season. He was named to the mid-season Texas League all-star team after producing a 1.64 ERA in 32 games with nine saves. He was released on July 15, 2015.

Milwaukee Brewers
Horst signed a minor league deal with the Milwaukee Brewers on July 21, 2015.

Somerset Patriots
On March 15, 2016, Horst signed with the Somerset Patriots of the Atlantic League of Professional Baseball.

Vaqueros Laguna
On June 24, 2016, Horst signed with the Vaqueros Laguna of the Mexican Baseball League. He was released on February 18, 2017.

References

External links

1985 births
Living people
Sportspeople from Cheyenne, Wyoming
Baseball players from Wyoming
Major League Baseball pitchers
Cincinnati Reds players
Philadelphia Phillies players
Armstrong State Pirates baseball players
Iowa Western Reivers baseball players
Gulf Coast Reds players
Billings Mustangs players
Dayton Dragons players
Sarasota Reds players
Carolina Mudcats players
Lynchburg Hillcats players
Louisville Bats players
Peoria Saguaros players
Phoenix Desert Dogs players
Estrellas Orientales players
American expatriate baseball players in the Dominican Republic
Lehigh Valley IronPigs players
Clearwater Threshers players
Tulsa Drillers players
Biloxi Shuckers players
Colorado Springs Sky Sox players
Somerset Patriots players